Skomorokhovo is a rural locality (a village) in Klyazminskoye Rural Settlement, Kovrovsky District, Vladimir Oblast, Russia. The population was 32 as of 2010.

Geography 
Skomorokhovo is located 15 km east of Kovrov (the district's administrative centre) by road. Tsepelevo is the nearest rural locality.

References 

Rural localities in Kovrovsky District